Maj Gen Ian Deetlefs (Rtd)  served in the South African Army's Reserve Force from 19652003. He became the first Chief of Defence Reserves of the South African National Defence Force in 1997. He retired from the SANDF in 2003 and was succeeded by Maj Gen R.C. Andersen.

Military career 
Gen Deetlefs has served with
 1 Special Service Battalion (1 SSB)
 Army Gymnasium
 6 South African Infantry Battalion (6SAI)
 Natal Carbineers
 Congella Regiment
 Natal Command

He served as Chief of Defence Reserves, SANDF and was the Founding Chairman of the Reserve Force Council (RFC)

Honours and awards

Medals 
Gen Deetlefs has been awarded the following:

Proficiency badges

References

External links 

South African generals
South African Army generals
South African businesspeople
South African military officers
Living people
Year of birth missing (living people)
Alumni of Maritzburg College